Rita sacerdotum, the Salween rita, is a species of bagrid catfish that occurs in Myanmar and Thailand where it is found in large rivers (such as the Salween River).

References 
 

Bagridae
Fish of Asia
Fish of Thailand
Taxa named by John Anderson (zoologist)
Fish described in 1879